Martin Fryand (born 27 March 1972) is a retired Swiss football midfielder.

References

1972 births
Living people
Swiss men's footballers
FC Sion players
FC Lausanne-Sport players
BSC Young Boys players
Association football midfielders
Swiss Super League players
FC Münsingen players